The Bible in Living English is a translation of the Bible by Steven T. Byington.

History 

Byington translated the Bible on his own for 45 years from 1898 to 1943, but was unable to have it published during his lifetime. After he died in 1957, the Watch Tower Bible and Tract Society acquired the publication rights, but the translation was not published until 1972. US copyright law therefore protected it until 2000; the Copyright Catalog does not list the Watch Tower Society as having applied for a renewal on this publication.  The translation may still be in copyright in countries not implementing the rule of the shorter term.

Use of Jehovah 

A notable characteristic of this translation was the use of God's name, which Byington translated Jehovah in the Old Testament. Byington states in his preface: “The spelling and the pronunciation are not highly important. What is highly important is to keep it clear that this is a personal name. There are several texts that cannot be properly understood if we translate this name by a common noun like Lord, or, much worse, by a substantivized adjective”.

References

External links
 The Bible in Living English Translated by Steven T. Byington
 Jehovah's Witnesses official website - God's Name and Bible Translators
 

1972 non-fiction books
Jehovah's Witnesses literature
Bible translations into English
1972 in Christianity
Sacred Name Movement